Cırdaxan (also, Dzhirdakhan and Dzhyrdakhan) is a village in the Barda Rayon of Azerbaijan.

References 

Populated places in Barda District